This is a list of images released to celebrate the Hubble Space Telescope's anniversaries. They celebrate its "birthday" when it was launched into orbit on April 24, 1990, by the crew of Space Shuttle Discovery.

15th (2005)
The 15th anniversary, in 2005, was celebrated with a collection of images of M51 (the Whirlpool Galaxy), and also with a section of the Eagle nebula. The 15th anniversary included a collection of other content including, in multiple languages, the video release, Hubble — 15 Years of Discovery.

17th (2007)
The 17th-anniversary celebration featured a panorama of part of the Carina Nebula, and a collection of images selected from that area.

18th (2008)
59 images of merging galaxies were released for the 18th anniversary on 24 April 2008.

19th (2009)

20th (2010)

21st (2011)

22nd (2012)

23rd (2013)

24th (2014)

25th (2015)

26th (2016)

27th (2017)

28th (2018)

29th (2019)
In April 2019, a special celebration image of the Southern Crab Nebula (aka Hen 2-104) was released. This nebula is located in the Constellation  Centaurus.

30th (2020)

31st (2021)

32nd (2022)

See also
List of Deep Fields

References

Hubble Space Telescope images
Astronomy image articles
Image galleries
Anniversaries